The Akai MPC (originally MIDI Production Center, now Music Production Center) is a series of music workstations produced by Akai from 1988 onwards. MPCs combine sampling and sequencing functions, allowing users to record portions of sound, modify them and play them back as sequences. 

The first MPCs were designed by Roger Linn, who had designed the successful LM-1 and LinnDrum drum machines in the 1980s. Linn aimed to create an intuitive instrument, with a grid of pads that can be played similarly to a traditional instrument such as a keyboard or drum kit. Rhythms can be built not just from samples of percussion but samples of any recorded sound.

Development

By the late 1980s, drum machines had become popular for creating beats and loops without musicians, and hip hop artists were using samplers to take portions of existing recordings and create new compositions. Grooveboxes, machines that combined these functions, such as those by E-mu Systems, required knowledge of music production and cost up to $10,000.

The original MPC, the MPC-60, was a collaboration between the Japanese company Akai and the American engineer Roger Linn. Linn had designed the successful LM-1 and LinnDrum, two of the earliest drum machines to use samples (prerecorded sounds). His company Linn Electronics had closed following the failure of the Linn 9000, a drum machine and sampler. According to Linn, his collaboration with Akai "was a good fit because Akai needed a creative designer with ideas and I didn't want to do sales, marketing, finance or manufacturing, all of which Akai was very good at". 

Linn described the MPC as an attempt to "properly re-engineer" the Linn 9000. He disliked reading instruction manuals and wanted to create an intuitive interface that simplified music production. He designed the functions, including the panel layout and hardware specification, and created the software with his team; he credited the circuitry to a team led by English engineer David Cockerell. Akai did the production engineering, making it "more manufacturable". The first model, the MPC60 (MIDI Production Center), was released on December 8, 1988, and retailed for $5,000. It was followed by the MPC60 MkII and the MPC3000, and the MPC2000, which Linn did not work on. 

After Akai went out of business in 2006, Linn left the company and its assets were purchased by Numark. Akai has continued to produce MPC models without Linn. Linn was critical, saying: "Akai seems to be making slight changes to my old 1986 designs for the original MPC, basically rearranging the deck chairs on the Titanic."

Features 

Instead of the switches and small hard buttons of earlier devices, the MPC has a 4x4 grid of large pressure-sensitive rubber pads which can be played similarly to a keyboard. The interface was simpler than those of competing instruments; it can be used without a studio and connected to a normal sound system. According to Vox, "most importantly, it wasn't an enormous, stationary mixing panel with as many buttons as an airplane cockpit".

Whereas artists had previously sampled long pieces of music, the MPC allowed them to sample smaller portions, assign them to separate pads, and trigger them independently, similarly to playing a traditional instrument such as a keyboard or drum kit. Rhythms can be built not just from percussion samples but any recorded sound, such as horns or synthesizers. 

The MPC60 only allows sample lengths of up to 13 seconds, as sampling memory was expensive at the time and Linn expected users to sample short sounds to create rhythms; he did not anticipate that they would sample long loops. Functions are selected and samples are edited with two knobs. Red “record” and “overdub” buttons are used to save or loop beats. The MPC60 has an LCD screen and came with floppy disks with sounds and instruments.

The MPC had a major influence on the development of electronic and hip hop music. It led to new sampling techniques, with users pushing its technical limits to creative effect. It had a democratizing effect on music production, allowing artists to create elaborate tracks without traditional instruments or recording studios. Its pad interface was adopted by numerous manufacturers and became standard in DJ technology.

Legacy 

Linn anticipated that users would sample short sounds, such as individual notes or drum hits, to use as building blocks for compositions. However, users began sampling longer passages of music. In the words of Greg Milner, the author of Perfecting Sound Forever, musicians "didn't just want the sound of John Bonham's kick drum, they wanted to loop and repeat the whole of 'When the Levee Breaks'." Linn said: "It was a very pleasant surprise. After 60 years of recording, there are so many prerecorded examples to sample from. Why reinvent the wheel?"

The MPC's ability to create percussion from any sound turned sampling into a new artform and allowed for new styles of music. Its affordability and accessibility had a democratizing effect; musicians could create tracks on a single machine without a studio or music theory knowledge, and it was inviting to musicians who did not play traditional instruments or had no music education. 

According to Vox, "The explosion of electronic music and hip hop could not have happened without a machine as intimately connected to the creative process as the MPC. It challenged the notion of what a band can look like, or what it takes to be a successful musician. No longer does one need five capable musicians and instruments." MPCs continue to be used in music, even with the advent of digital audio workstations, and fetch high prices on the used market. The 4x4 grid of pads was adopted by numerous manufacturers and became standard in DJ technology.

Engadget wrote that the impact of the MPC on hip hop "cannot be overstated". The British rapper Jehst saw it as the next step in hip hop evolution after the introduction of the TR-808, TR-909 and DMX drum machines in the 1980s. The American producer DJ Shadow used an MPC60 to create his influential 1996 album Endtroducing, which is composed entirely of samples. The American producer J Dilla disabled the quantize feature on his MPC to create his signature "off-kilter" sampling style. After his death, his MPC was preserved in the Smithsonian National Museum of African American History and Culture in 2014. The rapper Kanye West used the MPC to compose several of his best-known tracks and much of his breakthrough album The College Dropout; West closed the 2010 MTV Video Music Awards with a performance of his 2010 track "Runaway" on an MPC.

See also
Akai
Drum machine
Groovebox
Sampler

References

Further reading

External links
 Official Roger Linn site

Akai synthesizers
Samplers (musical instrument)
Music sequencers
Sound modules
Music workstations
MIDI controllers
Hip hop production
Japanese inventions
Musical instruments invented in the 1980s